Miss Venezuela 2017 was the 64th edition of the Miss Venezuela held on November 9, 2017 at the Estudio 5 de Venevisión in Caracas, Venezuela. At the end of the event, outgoing titleholder Keysi Sayago of Monagas crowned Sthefany Gutiérrez of Delta Amacuro as her successor.

The Miss World Venezuela title went to Miss Vargas, Veruska Ljubisavljević while Mariem Velazco, Miss Barinas, obtained the title of Miss Venezuela International. The 1st Runner-Up Biliannis Álvarez from Falcón was appointed as Miss Venezuela Grand.

Results 
Color key

Special Awards

These awards were given during the telecast of the pageant on November 9:

Interactive Beauty Gala
The following awards were given by fan vote on missvenezuela.com and Twitter. This year, they were given during the telecast of the pageant on November 9.

Other awards

Judges

Peggy Kopp – Miss Venezuela 1968
María Antonieta Cámpoli – Miss Venezuela 1972
Maritza Pineda – Miss Venezuela 1975
Inés María Calero – Actress and Miss Venezuela 1987
Cynthia Lander – TV host and Miss Venezuela 2001
Vanessa Peretti – Miss Venezuela International 2006
Angela Ruiz – International Model and 1st Runner-Up of Miss Venezuela 2010
Fanny Ottati – Model and TV host

Contestants

Notes 
 Sthefany Gutiérrez competed in Miss Universe 2018 in Bangkok, Thailand and placed as the 2nd Runner-up.
 Veruska Ljubisavljević competed in Miss World 2018 in Sanya, China and placed Top 30.
 Mariem Velazco won Miss International 2018 in Tokyo, Japan.
 Biliannis Álvarez competed in Miss Grand International 2018 in Yangon, Myanmar and placed Top 10.
 Nariman Battikha won Reina Hispanoamericana 2018. She also competed in Miss Supranational 2018 in Krynica-Zdrój, Poland and placed Top 10.
 María Sofía Contreras competed in Reinado Internacional del Café 2019 in Manizales, Colombia and placed as the 2nd Runner-up.

Notes

References

External links
Miss Venezuela Official Website

Miss Venezuela
2017 beauty pageants
2017 in Venezuela